Pedro Vaz Marinheiro was a Portuguese nobleman, navigator, resident and colonizer of the Azores Islands.

Pedro Vaz was born in Iberian Peninsula. He was one of the first settlers of the São Miguel Island, where he was known as "Marinheiro" due to the large number of ships he had in his residence located in Ponta Delgada. He was the father of Grimaneza Pires, who married in Azores with Estêvão Pires de Alpoim, notary in Santa Maria Island.

His brother, Diogo Vaz, was an inhabitant of Lagoa, Azores.

References

External links 

Nobiliário de familias de Portugal (PIRES)
Frei Gonçalo Velho - archive.org

1534 deaths
Portuguese Roman Catholics
16th-century Portuguese people
Portuguese nobility
Portuguese navigators
Year of birth unknown